Augenstein is a German surname. Notable people with the surname include:

Bruno Augenstein (1923–2005), German mathematician and physicist
Bryan Augenstein (born 1986), American baseball player
Christel Augenstein (born 1949), German politician (FDP)
Hans-Heinz Augenstein (1921–1944), German World War II flying ace

German-language surnames